van Moorsel is a Dutch surname. Notable people with the surname include:

Leontien van Moorsel (born 1970), Dutch cyclist
Paco van Moorsel (born 1989), Dutch footballer

Dutch-language surnames
Surnames of Dutch origin